The men's welterweight (67 kg/147.4 lbs) K-1 category at the W.A.K.O. World Championships 2007 in Belgrade was the fifth lightest of the K-1 tournaments, involving fourteen fighters from four continents (Europe, Asia, Africa and South America).  Each of the matches was three rounds of two minutes each and were fought under K-1 rules.

As the competition did not have enough fighters for a sixteen-man tournament, two of the competitors had a bye through to the quarter finals.  The eventual gold medallist was Piotr Kobylanski from Poland who defeated Gor Shavelyan from Russia in the final.  Defeated semi finalists Vitaliy Hubenko from the Ukraine and Yauheni Vinahradau from Belarus received bronze medals.

Results

See also
List of WAKO Amateur World Championships
List of WAKO Amateur European Championships
List of male kickboxers

References

External links
 WAKO World Association of Kickboxing Organizations Official Site

Kickboxing events at the WAKO World Championships 2007 Belgrade
2007 in kickboxing
Kickboxing in Serbia